The Copa de Competencia Jockey Club was an official Argentine football cup competition contested between 1907 and 1933. The winner of this Cup was allowed to play the Tie Cup against the Uruguayan champion of Copa de Competencia.

History
The Copa de Competencia Jockey Club was first awarded in 1907, being Alumni its first winner. Teams affiliated to the Argentine Football Association and Liga Rosarina de Football were allowed to enter to this competition. Rosarian teams participated until the 1919 edition. From the 1921 edition, only teams from the cities of Buenos Aires and La Plata took part of the competition.

After the final edition of the Tie Cup in 1919, the Copa de Competencia Jockey Club was played on four more occasions in 1921, 1925, 1931 and 1936. It was contested on a total of 17 occasions and the most successful teams were Alumni and San Isidro with three titles each.

List of champions

Finals
The following list includes all the editions of the Copa de Competencia: 

Notes

Titles by team

See also
 Copa de Competencia (Uruguay)
 Tie Cup

References

J
Recurring sporting events established in 1906
Recurring events disestablished in 1936
1906 establishments in Argentina
1936 disestablishments in Argentina